The Philippine Figure Skating Championships is the figure skating competition held annually to determine the national champions of the Philippines. Medals are awarded in the disciplines of men's singles, ladies' singles, pair skating, and ice dancing, although not every discipline is held every year due to a lack of participants. The event is organized by Philippine Skating Union formerly known as the Ice Skating Union of the Philippines, the sport's national governing body.

Previous Competitions

Divisions for 2018–19 season

Divisions for 2022–23 season

Senior Medalists

Men

Ladies

Pairs

Junior Medalists

Men

Ladies

Pairs

Novice and lower level medalists

Novice men

Novice Girls (2000) / Basic novice A (2005) / Basic Novice (since 2022)

Basic novice B ladies / Intermediate Novice (since 2022)

Advanced novice ladies

Intermediate Girls (2000) / Pre-novice Girls (2015)

Juvenile Girls

References

External links
 
 
 
 
 
 
 
 
 
 
 
 
 
 
 
 
 

Figure skating in the Philippines
Sports in Metro Manila
Figure skating national championships
National championships in the Philippines